The following lists represent the highest-grossing films in Turkey. This lists only accounts for the films' theatrical box office earning and not their ancillary revenues (i.e. home video rental and sales and television broadcast).

Turkey's highest-grossing films

Highest-grossing animated films

Franchises and film series adjusted for inflation 
This chart was compiled based on data from Box Office Mojo, by dividing the gross by the average ticket price to calculate an estimate of the total number of admissions.

See also
 List of Turkish films
 Cinema of Turkey

References

External links 
 https://boxofficeturkiye.com/

Turkey
Lists of Turkish films